The Sydney Combined Competition (SCC) formerly Inner City Combined Competition (ICCC) was an amateur rugby league competition for both senior and junior rugby league clubs in the St. George, Canterbury-Bankstown, Balmain, Western Suburbs and Eastern Suburbs areas of Sydney.

The competition replaced the Inner City Combined Competition in 2013. It featured over 40 clubs from under 13's right through to A Grade, before it was scrapped in favour of a new model in 2020.

District clubs

First Grade Premierships

See also

Rugby League Competitions in Australia

References

External links
Sydney Combined Competition

Rugby league competitions in New South Wales
Rugby league in Sydney
Amateur rugby league
2013 establishments in Australia
Sports leagues established in 2013